Antonio Casertano (20 December 1863 – 13 December 1938) was an Italian politician. He was born in Capua.

He was President of the Italian Chamber of Deputies from 1925 to 1929.
After his tenure as speaker of the lower chamber, he was named senator by King Vittorio Emanuele III.

References 

1863 births
1938 deaths
People from Capua
Social Democracy (Italy) politicians
Members of the Grand Council of Fascism
Presidents of the Chamber of Deputies (Italy)
Deputies of Legislature XXV of the Kingdom of Italy
Deputies of Legislature XXVI of the Kingdom of Italy
Deputies of Legislature XXVII of the Kingdom of Italy
Members of the Senate of the Kingdom of Italy
Politicians of Campania